José Iborra Blanco (born 12 June 1908 in Barcelona) was a former Spanish football player. He played for FC Barcelona  in 1935-36, Due to the Spanish revolution of 1936 he among others fled the country to Mexico.In 1938 he arrive in Mexico and quickly signed with Mexican club Real Club España which was mostly Spanish players. In 1943 he was contacted by Joaquín Díaz Loredo and Alfonso Sobero owners of the newly formed club Puebla. He would help Puebla win their first tournament in 1945 winning the Copa Mexico. He would go on to play for 4 years with Puebla playing over 200 games. He died on September 17, 2002 and was the last Spanish player who had fled the 1936 Spanish revolution to die.

References

External links

1908 births
2002 deaths
Footballers from Barcelona
Spanish footballers
Spanish expatriate footballers
Association football goalkeepers
Club Puebla players
Expatriate footballers in Mexico
La Liga players
Liga MX players
Real Club España footballers
Spanish expatriate sportspeople in Mexico
Catalonia international footballers